Elmer Lindroth (August 23, 1887 – September 9, 1942) was an American sports shooter. He competed in the 600m military rifle event at the 1920 Summer Olympics.

References

External links
 

1887 births
1942 deaths
American male sport shooters
Olympic shooters of the United States
Shooters at the 1920 Summer Olympics
People from Rockford, Illinois
Sportspeople from Illinois